Outroduction is collection of B-Sides by The New Amsterdams. It is intended to be the final release by the band, allowing Matt Pryor to continue pursuing a solo career.

Track listing

Reception 
"Whether it's with emo legends the Get Up Kids or his more folk-oriented solo project the New Amsterdams, Matt Pryor is a songwriter who seems beautifully adept at finding just the right balance between sugary sweet pop and earnest emotion. Able to keep things light without becoming saccharine and heartfelt without being too heavy-handed, Pryor is at the vanguard of heart-on-sleeve musicians." - Allmusic

"Who knew an album of outtakes and B-sides could work so well? [...] Even though Outroduction is a swan song of sorts, it’s a great place to check out The New Amsterdams’ brand of folky indie rock. While the band may be no more (though Pryor is apparently going solo), these are songs worth hearing, and the fact that these are leftovers only makes them that much more impressive." - The firenote

Personnel
Matt Pryor - Vocals, Guitar
Bill Belzer - Drums
Eric McCann - Upright Bass
Dustin Kinsey - Guitar
Jason Rich 
Zach Holland - Keyboard
Roget Moutenout - Producer, Mixing

References

2013 albums
The New Amsterdams albums